Thos. W. Ward Ltd was a Sheffield, Yorkshire, steel, engineering and cement business, which began as coal and coke merchants. It expanded into recycling metal for Sheffield's steel industry, and then the supply and manufacture of machinery.

In 1894, as part of the scrap metal operation, Ward's began to set up substantial shipbreaking yards in different parts of England, and in Scotland and Wales. By 1953, Thos. W. Ward employed 11,500 people.

Ward's business was reorganised at the end of the 1970s, when it moved from being an engineering group with a motley assortment of subsidiaries to being principally dependent on cement. In 1982, it was bought by RTZ.

History
This business was founded by Thomas William Ward in 1878 with the name Thos. W. Ward. Ward's provided coal and coke, and very soon recycling or scrap metal services. It added dealing in new and used machinery related to the iron, steel, coal, engineering and allied industries, and manufacturing that machinery.

Ward's Constructional Engineering Department manufactured and erected steel-framed buildings, bridges, collieries, steel works equipment and furnaces. The Rail Department supplied light and heavy rails, sleepers, switches and crossings, and equipped complete sidings. De Lank Quarries produced the granite for Tower Bridge and Blackfriars Bridge, as well as major lighthouses and prestige buildings in London and elsewhere.

Shipbreaking
In 1894, Ward's moved into ship breaking at many different locations. On 19 May 1904, a limited liability company was formed and registered, to manage all the businesses operating under the name Thos. W. Ward. By 1920, when raising further capital from the public, the prospectus claimed these notable aspects of Thos. W. Ward: "Premier shipbreaking firm in the world, largest stockholders to the iron, steel and machinery trades, constructional engineers, merchants, etc."

Portland Cement
New capital was raised from the public in 1928 to establish a new greenfield Portland cement business at Ketton in Rutland, on 1,170 acres of freehold land, containing oolitic limestone and clays suitable for the production of the highest quality, rapid-hardening Portland cement. It was a particular project of new chairman Joseph Ward (1865–1941), brother of Thomas Ward (1853–1926). Ketton Cement Works became the core activity of Ward's in the late 1970s.

After 55 years, in 1934, when the employees numbered in excess of 4,000 people, the principal businesses were:
Construction, mechanical and electrical engineering manufacturers
Coal coke iron steel metal and machinery factors and merchants
Ship and works dismantlers, owners and brokers
Wharf owners
Machinery and plant valuers
Nut and bolt manufacturers
Horn handle manufacturers for cutlery
Brick manufacturers
Dry slag and tar macadam manufacturers
Quarrying

Freehold Premises:
Albion Works, Tinsley and Millhouses, Sheffield
and at Silvertown, Grays (Essex), Inverkeithing, Glasgow, Wishaw, Birmingham, Briton Ferry, Milford Haven, Lelant, Silverdale, Low Moor (Bradford), Albion (Mansfield) sand quarries etc and Brickworks at Longton, Newark and Apedale

Leasehold Premises:
Charlton Works and Effingham Road, Sheffield
Liverpool, Dublin, Cornish Granite Quarries (De Lank), Denny, Preston, Barrow-in-Furness, Pembroke Dock, Hayle and Scunthorpe.

Subsidiaries:
Milford Haven Dock & Railway Company, Low Moor Best Yorkshire Iron, The Midland Iron Co, Pengwern and Gwydir Quarries, The Drybrook Quarries, North Lonsdale Tar Macadam.
The Ketton Portland Cement Co (controlling interest)

W. S. Laycock
This old-established business was bought in 1934. Laycock's made railway carriage and steamship fittings, underframes for locomotives and railway coaches, and automobile axles, gearboxes, propeller shafts and Laycock's own Layrub flexible drive joints. Two years later, Laycock Engineering was sold to some investors.

1970s
By 1969, the Ward group was believed to be primarily in metal supply, particularly from ship breaking, but also producing cement, supplying roadstone, constructing rail sidings, and building new industrial works and equipping them with the necessary plant and machinery.

Division
In October 1981, Thos. W. Ward's was split into three:
Thos. W. Ward (Raw Materials) the former iron and steel division active in processing and merchanting carbon scrap, special steel scrap, non-ferrous scrap metals and steel stockholding.
Thos. W. Ward (Industrial Supplies)
Thos. W. Ward (Industrial Dismantling)

Within a short time, Rio Tinto Zinc (RTZ) began to buy a substantial shareholding and the takeover was completed in early 1982. RTZ amalgamated the Ward cement operation with that of Tunnel Holdings, and named the combination RTZ Cement, which then had about one quarter of the UK cement market. The Railway Engineers department of Thos. W Ward was bought by Henry Boot. RTZ sold Thos. W. Ward (Roadstone) to Ready Mixed Concrete in June 1988.

Ship and Works' dismantlers
Works dismantled before 1926: Abbott's Works, Gateshead; Bowling Ironworks; Kelham Rolling Mills, Sheffield; Derwent Rolling Mills, Workington; Dearne & Dove Works; West Cumberland Whittington Works, Crawshay's Cyfarthfa Works, Bessemer's Works, Bolton; Mars Ironworks, Wolverhampton; Effingham Nut and Bolt Works, Sheffield. Thos W. Ward. also dismantled the Crystal Palace.

HMS Akbar

Cordoba

Terec

List of ships broken up at Inverkeithing

HMS Magnificent (1922)
HMS Dreadnought (1923)
HMS Mars (1929)
SS Zeeland (1930)
HMS Tiger (1932)
RMS Cedric (1932)
 (Hull only during 1937 — the superstructure was removed at Jarrow between 1935 and 1937)
RMS Majestic/HMS Caledonia (1943)
HMAS/M Otway (September 1945)
HMS/M Uproar (February 1946)
HMS/M Unruly (February 1946)
HMS/M Unsparing (14 February 1946)
HMS Revenge (1948)
HMS Royal Sovereign (1948)
 (1949)
HMS Rodney (1949)
RMS Empress of Australia (1952)
HMS Formidable (1953)
RMS Maloja (1954)
 (1955)
 (1958) 
 (1961)
MV Britannic III (1961)
HMS/M Thule (14 September 1962)
HMS Concord (22 October 1962)
RMS Mauretania (1965) (second vessel to carry the name for Cunard)
MT Haakon Hauan (1960)
 (1946)
SS Hilary (1959)
, June 1958 --> 1960/61
HMS Armada (1965)
HMS/M Alaric (July 1971)
HMS/M Ambush (July 1971)
HMS/M Amphion [became Anchorite]. (July 1971)
 (1970)
HMS Maidstone (May 1978)
HMS Roberts(1965)
KdF ship Robert Ley (1947)
HMS Lion(1975)

List of ships broken up at Briton Ferry

El Inca 1979

Marrakech 1979

RFA Salvestor

ST Sea Alarm

List of ships broken up at Grays

RFA Robert Dundas
RFA Sea Salvor

Cutty Sark

List of ships broken up at Preston

List of ships broken up at Barrow-in-Furness

RFA Abbeydale

TSS Duke of Clarence

HMT Dongola

List of ships broken up at Morecambe

List of ships broken up at Pembroke Dock

HMT Richard Bacon

List of ships broken up at Milford Haven

List of ships broken up at Lelant or Hayle

Lizzie the elephant
At the outbreak of World War I, 1,235 people were on the payroll of Thomas Ward's company and a thousand tons of scrap metal per day was being fed to the country's steel makers. However, with demand so high, and many of the horses Ward had previously used to transport his goods around Sheffield requisitioned by the military, he had an increasingly difficult time to match supply with demand. Lizzie the Elephant was brought in as a solution to the problem.

After work horses from Thomas Ward's were sent or requisitioned to the front in World War I, Lizzie the Elephant was drafted in from Sedgwick's Menagerie, a travelling circus run by William Sedgwick (1841–1927). The elephant was said to be able to do the work of three of Ward's horses and soon got herself the name "Tommy Ward's Elephant" as she became a familiar sight carrying or hauling goods around Sheffield, controlled by her trainer Richard Sedgwick (1875–1931) (son of the circus ringleader William Sedgwick). Lizzie was said to have inspired other Sheffield firms to creative means with their wartime transport, and a company in the Wicker area of the city was said to have used camels, also from Sedgwick's Menagerie, in place of their own horses. Unfortunately, walking around the cobblestoned streets of Sheffield damaged Lizzie's feet and, although she continued to work for Ward's firm for sometime after the end of the First World War, she was eventually returned to the circus.

Lizzie has gone down in Sheffield legend, and there are many stories about her adventures. She also gave her name to the popular Sheffield sayings, "done up like Tommy Ward's elephant" — meaning someone carrying too much weight — and the self-explanatory "like trying to shift Tommy Ward's elephant". A Sheffield Community Transport Optare Solo bus was named "Lizzie Ward" after her.

References

Publications

External links
Gracesguide.co.uk: Information on Thos W Ward yard
Liverpoolmuseums.org: Information on Thos W Ward company
Sheffield Educated - Lizzie the Elephant
Information on the elephant

Ship breaking
Defunct companies based in Yorkshire
Sheffield
British companies established in 1873
Manufacturing companies disestablished in 1982
Energy companies established in 1873
Waste management companies of the United Kingdom
1982 mergers and acquisitions
1982 disestablishments in England
British companies disestablished in 1982